Mullah Abdul Razzaq Akhund is an Afghan Taliban politician and military personal who is currently serving as Chiefs of Staff of the 207 Al-Farooq Corps since 4 March 2022. Akhund has also served as Deputy Minister of Martyrs and Disabled Affairs from 4 October 2021 to 4 March 2022.

References

Living people
Taliban government ministers of Afghanistan
Year of birth missing (living people)